The 2021–22 Women's T20 Cup was the second edition of the Women's T20 Cup, a Twenty20 women's cricket competition played in Zimbabwe. The tournament took place between 24 and 31 March 2022, with four teams competing in a double round-robin group stage.

Eagles won the tournament, beating Mountaineers to claim their second T20 title in two seasons. The tournament followed the Fifty50 Challenge, also won by Eagles.

Competition format
Teams played in a double round-robin in a group of four, therefore playing 6 matches overall. Matches were played using a Twenty20 format. The top two in the group advanced to the final.

The group worked on a points system with positions being based on the total points. Points are awarded as follows:

Win: 10 points. 
Tie: 5 points. 
Loss: 0 points.
Abandoned/No Result: 5 points.

Points table

 advanced to Final

Fixtures

Group stage

Final

Statistics

Most runs

Source: ESPN Cricinfo

Most wickets

Source: ESPN Cricinfo

References

External links
 Series home at ESPNcricinfo

Women's T20 Cup
2022 in Zimbabwean cricket
Domestic cricket competitions in 2021–22